No Stranger to Danger is the second studio album by American thrash metal band Lȧȧz Rockit. It was released in 1985 on Target Records in USA and Steamhammer Records in Europe.

Track listing

Credits
Lȧȧz Rockit
 Michael Coons – lead vocals, backing vocals
 Aaron Jellum – rhythm guitar, lead guitar, backing vocals
 Phil Kettner – rhythm guitar, lead guitar, acoustic guitar, backing vocals
 Willie Lange – bass, backing vocals
 Victor Agnello – drums, synthesizer

Production
 Mark Whitaker – producer, engineering
 Mark Leonard – executive producer
 Robert Biles – engineer
 Jeff Sanders – mastering engineer
 Chuck Rosa – mix-down engineer
 Peter McNulty – second engineer
 Neil Zlozower – photography
 Jeff Weller – design
 Elixabeth Stabholtz – stylist

References

1985 albums
Lȧȧz Rockit albums